Gilbert Hay may refer to:

Gilbert Hay (poet) (1403–?), Scottish poet
Gilbert Hay, 11th Earl of Erroll, Scottish nobleman
Gilbert I de la Hay (died 1263), co-Regent of Scotland during King Alexander III of Scotland's minority
Gilbert II de la Hay (died 1333), Lord High Constable of Scotland